Blerta Basholli (born in 1983, Prishtina, Kosovo) is a Kosovan writer, director and producer. Basholli has previously lived in New York City for a time span of four years, allowing her to work on a number of projects as a student, among those being her short film “Lena and Me” which won awards in a number of international and Kosovo-based festivals. In 2008 she was awarded with the Deans Fellowship at the Film Graduate Program at Tisch School of the Artists, NYU. Most recently, her debut feature film “Hive” (2021) has achieved great success, breaking Sundance Records, and becoming the first Kosovo film to enter the Oscars shortlist nomination.

Personal life 
Basholli completed her higher education at NYU, New York City, however she is currently based in Prishtina. She is married to Artan Korenica, a well-known Kosovan photographer, with whom she has two children.

Career 
2006-2011: Beginnings

In 2006 Basholli came out with her first film, the documentary “Mirror, mirror…”. It went on to have substantial success, being selected at the Sarajevo Film Festival 2006; Tirana International Film Festival 2006; Balkan Black Box Film Festival 2006, Berlin and the New York International Independent Film and Video Festival 2016. In 2008 she released “Gjakova 726”, a short film that was shown at the Rotterdam Film Festival 2009; Busho Film Festival 2009; Dokufest 2009; Toffifest 2009; Filmmor's Women's Film Festival 2009. Later on, in 2011, Basholli's short film “Lena and Me’’ was screened and awarded at the First Run Film Festival 2011; Dokufest 2011; Pogradec Film and Food Festival 2011; Skena Up 2011; Tirana International FF 2011 and the 9/11 Film Festival 2012 (Best Actress Award).

2021-Present: Worldwide Recognition

Her most known film comes in 2021, and it tells the true story of Fahrije Hoti, a Kosovan woman’s challenge of opening a business in a patriarchal community. The film is called “Hive” and it is Basholli's first feature film.“Hive” broke Sundance records, where it won the Grand Jury Prize, the Directing Award, and the Audience Award in the World Cinema Dramatic Category. Through “Hive” Basholli has also become the first Kosovan director to make it into the Oscars nomination shortlist, in the Best International Feature category.

Filmography 

 Mirror, Mirror... (Documentary) (writer, director) 2006
 Gjakova 726 (Video short) (co-writer, director) 2008
 Lena dhe Unë (Short) (writer) 2011
 Everything Is Broken Up and Dances (co-producer) 2016
 Hive (writer, director) 2021
 The Marriage (first assistant director) 2017
 The Return (assistant director) 2017
 Unwanted (first assistant director) 2017
 Looking for Venera (first assistant director) 2021
 Cold November (production manager) 2018

References 

Kosovan film directors
Kosovan women writers
Kosovan film producers
Kosovan women film producers
Living people
1983 births
Kosovan women film directors